is a subway station on the Tokyo Metro Hibiya Line in Tsukiji, Chūō, Tokyo, Japan, operated by the Tokyo subway operator Tokyo Metro.

Lines
Tsukiji Station is served by the Hibiya Line, and is numbered H-11.

Station layout
Tsukiji station has a simple side platform arrangement with two tracks.

Access to the station is provided by two sets of entrances and exits, with a total of four points of entry in total. Exits 1 and 2 are on opposite sides of Route 50 at the southern end of the station near the fish market. Exits 3 and 4 are also on opposite sides of the same road but at the northern end of the station.

Platforms

History
Tsukiji Station opened on 28 February 1963.

The station facilities were inherited by Tokyo Metro after the privatization of the Teito Rapid Transit Authority (TRTA) in 2004.

Surrounding area

 Shintomichō Station ( Tokyo Metro Yurakucho Line) (approximately 2 minutes' walk)

The station is located in the Tsukiji neighbourhood of Chūō, Tokyo. Only a few blocks south of the station (about 150 m) lies Tsukiji fish market, the largest seafood market in the world. On the eastern side of the station is the Tsukiji Hongan-ji, a pilgrimage site for Buddhists worldwide.

References

External links

 Tokyo Metro station information 

Buildings and structures in Chūō, Tokyo
Railway stations in Tokyo
Railway stations in Japan opened in 1963
Tokyo Metro Hibiya Line
Tsukiji